 
Harbour Centre is a skyscraper in the central business district of Downtown Vancouver, British Columbia, Canada which opened in 1977. The "Lookout" tower atop the office building makes it one of the tallest structures in Vancouver and a prominent landmark on the city's skyline. With its 360-degree viewing deck, it also serves as a tourist attraction with the Top of Vancouver Revolving Restaurant, offering a physically unobstructed view of the city.

Harbour Centre is located at 555 West Hastings Street in Downtown Vancouver. It is steps away from Waterfront Station, a major multi-modal transit hub which serves as the Downtown Vancouver terminal for various TransLink operations including SeaBus, West Coast Express, SkyTrain, Canada Line and buses. Simon Fraser University operates its downtown Harbour Centre campus in the adjoining Spencer building and houses the Center for Dialogue and Canadas World.

Vancouver Coast Guard Radio operates from Harbour Centre, providing distress watch and vessel traffic services to the North Arm Fraser River, Burrard Inlet, Indian Arm, English Bay and Howe Sound.

History
The downtown Simpsons-Sears department store was located here before it closed in 1987.

During the dot-com boom of the 1990s, it served as the headquarters for several tech firms, including Stormix Technologies, NetNation and others.

Official Height Discrepancies
Designed by WZMH Architects, the building is listed as being 28 stories tall, though the tower/observation deck extends above the 28 office floors (claimed to be approximately 40 stories in total). There is some disagreement as to the building's height. The CTBUH however lists the buildings architectural height as actually being . Furthermore, Skyscraperpage lists the buildings height to the roof as being only . It also lists the buildings pinnacle height to the tip of the antenna as being .

The building was British Columbia's tallest measured by pinnacle height until the construction of Living Shangri-La in 2009.

Tourist attraction 
The Vancouver Lookout tourist attraction, located atop the Harbour Centre business building, was officially opened on August 13, 1977 by Neil Armstrong, whose footprint was imprinted onto cement and was on display on the viewing/observation deck until disappearing during renovations. Glass elevators whisk visitors 168 meters (553 feet) skyward from street level to the Observation Deck in 40 seconds.

In television and film

In Beyond Belief: Fact or Fiction?, a group of young teenage girls ride the famous glass elevator to the top to dine at the fictional "Above the Clouds" restaurant and the elevator breaks down. (S04E13 - "Above the Clouds"). 
Harbour Centre can also be seen in the Arrow episode "Dark Waters".  The Harbour Centre is visible in the background along with the rest of the downtown Vancouver skyline at the beginning of The X-Files episode "2Shy".
This building was also filmed in some episodes from the original MacGyver TV series in and around Vancouver. This building also had some shots from the TV Series Danger Bay. There were also some shots from the Schwarzenegger film The 6th Day and the film Blade: Trinity. In The NeverEnding Story (film), Building is seen in closing scene, when Bastian is flying with Falkor, to get some revenge over the kids.

Gallery

See also 
 List of tallest buildings in Vancouver
Lighthouse of Alexandria, a possible influence on design.

References

External links 
 Harbour Centre (business building site)
 Top of Vancouver Revolving Restaurant

Shopping malls established in 1977
1977 establishments in British Columbia
Modernist architecture in Canada
Buildings and structures with revolving restaurants
Shopping malls in Metro Vancouver
Skyscrapers in Vancouver
Tourist attractions in Vancouver
Transmitter sites in Canada
Skyscraper office buildings in Canada
Observation towers in Canada